Marina Schiano (18 November 1941 - 8 September 2019) was an Italian fashion model, muse, fashion stylist, journalist, photographer and a jewelry designer.

Early life
Schiano was born in Naples, Italy to parents Michele Schiano and Anna Facciolli. Her father was involved in construction and her mother had an aristocratic background. Her childhood was said to be unhappy, she was described as tall for her age, strong-willed, a deep husky voice and was described as unattractive, especially by her mother. At age 14 or 15, she left home and traveled to Milan to become a model. After the death of her father, she moved to Rome where her uncle lived and studied political science at university. Returning to Milan later, she met model Elsa Peretti.

Career
Sciano arrived in New York in 1967 with her friend Elsa Peretti. There she was said to have been discovered by photographer Yasuhiro Wakabayashi. In 1968, she appeared in a twenty-eight-page feature in Vogue, photographed by Henry Clark. During her time in modelling and fashion, she worked with many photographers including Jeanloup Sieff, Clive Arrowsmith, Annie Leibovitz, Richard Avedon, John Fairchild, Herb Ritts and Grace Coddington. She appeared in many international editions of Vogue and other fashion magazines. She worked with many fashion designers including Valentino Garavani and Giancarlo Giammetti, in particular a muse to Yves Saint Laurent and François Nars. As a socialite, she became part of the New York society scene, seen regularly with Andy Warhol, Diana Vreeland and Diane von Fürstenberg.

In 1972, she was hired by fashion designer Yves Saint Laurent and his business partner Pierre Bergé to manage the YSL store in New York. Her responsibilities increased and she became YSL's Communications Director and Vice-President for North America and managed their 52 boutiques and 21 licencees. She was responsible for YSL's launch of the perfume Opium in the US in 1977. In 1980 she stepped down at YSL, formed her own public relations firm, and managed the company's image. She ended her relationship with YSL in 1982. She then joined Calvin Klein as their National and International Director of Public Relation, attempting to bring some contacts and glamour to the brand. After three years, she joined Vanity Fair as its Creative Style Director for editor Tina Brown. There she would dress Madonna, Cindy Crawford and K.D.Lang for some of the magazine's famous covers. In 1992 she was retrenched from Vanity Fair in a shake-up by editor Graydon Carter. Schiano then began her own line of over-sized jewelry consisting of semiprecious jeweled silver and gold rings, something she had indulged in before, sold in high-end stores. Around 2001, she withdrew from her New York life and friends and moved to Brazil with her husband.

Marriage
Her first marriage in 1973 was to Andy Warhol's business manager Frederick Hughes. The marriage was brief but allowed her to obtain a green card. Later she married photographer Marcus Vinícius Coelho, with whom she was married for more than forty years.

Death
Schiano died in Porto Seguro, Brazil from complications following surgery for kidney cancer. She was survived by her husband, Marcus Vinícius Coelho.

Filmography
 Stardust Memories (1980) as Cabaret Patron

References

1941 births
2019 deaths
Italian female models
Italian jewellery designers
Models from Naples
Vogue (magazine) people
Fashion stylists
American socialites